The University of Baghdad (UOB) ( Jāmi'at Baghdād) is the largest university in Iraq, tenth largest in the Arab world, and the largest university in the Arab world outside Egypt.

Nomenclature
Both University of Baghdad and Baghdad University are used interchangeably.

History
The College of Islamic Sciences claims that it originated in 1067 A.D. as Abu-Haneefa. However, the College of Law, the earliest of the modern institutions that were to become the first constituent Colleges (i.e. Faculties) of the University of Baghdad, was founded in 1908.
 
The College of Engineering was established in 1921; the Higher Teachers Training College and the Lower College of Education in 1923, the College of Medicine in 1927, and the College of Pharmacy in 1936. In 1942, the first higher institution for girls, Queen Alia College, was established. In 1943, proposals for further new Colleges appeared, leading to the foundation of the College of Arts and the College of Science in 1949, and Abu Ghraib College of Agriculture in 1950.

The university building was commissioned by the Royal Government of Iraq in the late 1950s and is located on the banks of the Tigris River. Its buildings were designed by Walter Gropius, Louis McMillen, and Robert McMillan, of The Architects' Collaborative, and were made from 1957 to 1960. The architects master plan for a new university campus, included the Schools of Engineering, Science, and Liberal Arts, for a total of 6,800 students. 

The campus was expanded in 1982 to accommodate 20,000 students. Architects Hisham N. Ashkouri and Robert Owen developed the academic spaces program for the entire campus.

Baghdad University suffered badly from the occupation in Iraq, started in 2003, with more than 90% of its students dropping out of some classes.

In September 2018, the university was listed in the Times Higher Education World University Rankings, a yearly classification of the best 1,250 universities in the world, for the first time.

Presidents
 Dr. Matti Aqrawi — 5 October 1957 – 1 August 1958
 Dr. Abdul Jabbar Abdullah — 19 March 1959 – 8 March 1963
 Dr. Abed Al-Azeez Al-Duri — 10 February 1963 – 27 November 1965 and 10 September 1966 – 7 August 1968
 Dr. Jassem Mohammad Al-Kallaf — 9 September 1968 – 8 August 1970
 Dr. Abed Allatif Al-Badry — 8 August 1970 – 1 March 1971
 Dr. Saad Abed Al-Bakki Al-Rawi — 15 June 1971 – 23 January 1974
 Dr. Taha Ibrahim Al-Abdalla — 14 March 1974 – 15 October 1977
 Dr. Sulttan Abed Al-Kader Al-Shawi — 18 October 1977 – 1 March 1978
 Dr. Taha Tayh Diab Al-Ne'ami — 30 June 1980 – 27 December 1990
 Dr. Adil Shakir Al-Tai — 10 July 1990 – 28 February 1991
 Dr. Khidir Jasim Al-Duri — 1 March 1991 – 10 November 1993
 Dr. Abed Al-Iillah Yossif Al-Kashab — 14 November 1993 – 7 June 2001
 Dr. Mohammad Abed Allah Falah Al-Rawi — 12 June 2001 – 30 April 2003
 Dr. Sammi Abed Al-Mahdi Al-Mudaffar — 24 May 2003 – 28 September 2003
 Dr. Musa Juwad Aziz Al-Musawi — 28 September 2003 – 20 November 2012
 Dr. Alaa Abdulrasool Alkashwan — 20 November 2012 – 13 May 2019
 Dr. Qusi Alsuhil — 13 May 2019
 Dr. Nabeel Alsahib — 22 July 2020

Campuses

Al-Jadriya campus
 College of Engineering
 Al-Khwarizmi College of Engineering
 College of Science
 College of Political Science
 College of Physical Education
 College of Science for Women
 College of Education for Women
 Institute of Laser for Postgraduate Studies
 Institute of Urban and Regional Planning
 Institute of Genetic Engineering
 Institute of Accounting & Financial Studies
 College of Agricultural

Bab Al-Muadham campus
 College of Medicine
 College of Dentistry
 College of Pharmacy
 College of Nursing
 College of Education – Ibn Rushd
 College of Arts
 College of Languages
 College of Information
 College of Islamic Sciences

Al-Waziriya campus
 College of Physical Education for Women
 College of Law
 College of Administration, Business and Economy
 College of Education – Ibn Al-Haytham
 College of Fine Arts
 College of Veterinary

Nahda CrossRoad
 Al-Kindi College of Medicine

Notable alumni
 Mohammed Alkobaisi – Islamic scholar
 Hisham N. Ashkouri – architect
 Serwan Baban – Minister in the Kurdistan Regional Government
 Venus Faiq (born 1963), Iraqi-Kurd Dutch writer, journalist, and poet.
 Abd al-Rahman al-Bazzaz – former Prime Minister of Iraq
 Muzaffar Al-Nawab – Iraqi poet and writer
 Emad Zaki Yehya – international petroleum consultant and former president of Reservoir Engineering in the Ministry of Oil
 Saadoun al-Dulaimi – former Iraqi Defense Minister
 Ghanim Al-Jumaily – Professor of Engineering at Southern New Hampshire University; former Ambassador of Iraq to Saudi Arabia
 Ghassan Muhsen – diplomat and artist
 Ahmad Obeidat – former Prime Minister of Jordan
 Sinan Al Shabibi – former Governor of the Central Bank of Iraq
 Rihab Taha – biological weapons chief
 Jalal Talabani – former President of Iraq
 Abdurrahman Wahid – President of Indonesia
 Donny George Youkhanna – archaeologist
 Muntadhar al-Zaidi – journalist
 Hashim Jasin – spiritual leader (Shura Council) of the Pan-Malaysian Islamic Party
 Suad Jawad – "The Queen of Dubbing"
 Aqeel al-Mosawi – dentist, novelist, and photographer
 Hazim Abdallah Khedr - historian and researcher specialized in Andalusian Arabic literature.

Notable development consultants
 Cyril Saunders, UNESCO Library Development consultant, 1952–1955
 Harold Bonny, UNESCO Library Development consultant, 1957–1958
 Donald Powell (University of Arizona), USAID/ICA Library Development consultant at Abu Ghraib College, 1957
 William S. Dix (Librarian, University of Princeton), Ford Foundation Library Development consultant, 1958
 Des Raj Kalia, UNESCO Library Development consultant, 1959–1960
 Stephen Ford (University of Michigan) and Paul Kebabian (New York Public Library), Ford Foundation Library Development consultants, 1961–1962.
 Rudolph Gjelsness (Professor and Head of the Department of Library Science, University of Michigan), Ford Foundation Library Development consultant, 1962–1963
 David T. Wilder (University Librarian, University of Michigan – Oakland), Ford Foundation Library Development consultant, 1965–66
 Anand P. Srivastava (Head of the Department of Library Science, University of Rajasthan), UNESCO consultant, Graduate School of Library Science, 1968–1973
 Khalil M. H. Al-Shamma', Former Dean, College of Administration, Business and Economy, Reorganization of the University of Baghdad and The Higher Education sector, 1969, Donated his rich personal library with its complete furniture to the Central Library of the University of Baghdad /Al-Jadriya Campus 2012.

See also
 College of Science – University of Baghdad
 Iraqi Journal of Physics

References

External link 
 Official website 
 University of Baghdad Website 

 
Baghdad
Education in Baghdad
Educational institutions established in the 20th century
1957 establishments in Iraq
Walter Gropius buildings